Iradj Fazel (also romanized as "Īraj Fāżel"; born 24 April 1939) is a prominent Iranian surgeon and academic. He was the president of the Iranian Academy of Medical Sciences for 19 years, until 2010. In the aftermath of the 2009 Iranian presidential election, he wrote a public letter, protesting the way Iranian youth were being treated. Subsequently, he was removed as the president of the Iranian Academy of Medical Sciences by President Ahmadinejad.

Fazel studied Medicine at University of Tehran and pursued his studies in the United States. He specialized in organ transplantation.

Fazel is a full professor at the medical school of National University of Iran (then Shahid Beheshti University). He is a former minister of health and medical education and president of the Iranian Society of Surgeons.

Fazel graduated from Tehran Medical School in 1964. He is a diplomate of the American Board of Surgery and professor of surgery at Shahid Beheshti University of Medical Sciences in Tehran, Iran. He is a founding member of Iranian Association of Surgeons and its current president, and president of the Iranian Society for Organ Transplantation. He is also the founder of the Iranian Academy of Medical Sciences and served in the capacity of life member and president for 20 years. He is a prominent and highly specialized surgeon with an outstanding record of services in care of war casualties during Iran-Iraq war. He served as the minister of Higher Education in 1985 and the minister of Health and Medical Education in 1989. He also served two terms as the president of Iran Medical Council  in 1991-1996 and 2017-2019.

Representative publications

References

Iranian Academy of Medical Sciences
Iranian transplant surgeons
University of Tehran alumni
Government ministers of Iran
Living people
1939 births
Recipients of the Order of Knowledge
Impeached Iranian officials removed from office
Academic staff of Shahid Beheshti University
Ministers of science of Iran